The House Subcommittee on Conservation, Research and Biotechnology is a subcommittee within the House Agriculture Committee. It was first created during the 110th Congress as the Subcommittee on Horticulture and Organic Agriculture, though horticulture is no longer under its jurisdiction.

It is currently chaired by Republican Jim Baird of Indiana.

Jurisdiction
Policies and statutes related to resource conservation; pest and disease management, including pesticides; bioterrorism; adulteration and quarantine matters; research, education, and extension; biotechnology; and related oversight of such issues.

Members, 118th Congress

Historical membership rosters

115th Congress

116th Congress

117th Congress

Notes

References

External links
Subcommittee page

Agriculture Nutrition and Horticulture